Barry Corr (born 2 April 1985) is an Irish former professional football striker and currently first team coach at Cambridge United.

Club career

Early career
Corr started his career at St. Anthony's, Kilcoole before moving to  Leeds United. After four years at Leeds he moved to Sheffield Wednesday. At Wednesday he had loan spells with Bristol City, where he scored his first professional goal, and Swindon Town, helping them achieve promotion to League One with 3 goals in his 8 appearances and a nomination for League Two player of the month for April. He signed for Swindon on a permanent basis at the start of the 2007–08 season, later moving to Exeter City in July 2009. He left the club at the end of the season.

Southend United
Corr signed for Southend United on 9 July 2010 along with Peter Gilbert, both of whom had played previously for Southend's manager Paul Sturrock at Sheffield Wednesday. From 47 appearances he netted 21 goals for the Shrimpers, making him the club's highest scorer that season. He missed the whole of the 2011–12 season due to an ongoing knee injury, and returned on 22 September 2012 to score against former club Exeter. He spent most of the 2012–13 season as a substitute, but became a mainstay of the team the following season as Sturrock was replaced by Phil Brown. Corr signed a new two-year deal with Southend at the end of the season, and made his 150th appearance for the Blues on 27 September 2014 against Shrewsbury Town. Corr scored 63 goals in 181 appearances for Southend United. His last appearance coming in the penalty shootout victory over Wycombe at Wembley earning promotion to League One.

Cambridge United
Corr signed a two-year deal with Cambridge United on 2 June 2015. He made his debut for the U's on the opening day of the 2015-16 season, scoring twice in a 3-0 victory over Newport County. His campaign was cut short in January 2016 as he had to undergo knee surgery, he had scored 12 goals in 24 appearances by that point.  He was released when his contract expired in June 2017.  He continued to train with the club after his release, and on 12 January 2018 he signed on non-contract terms until the end of the month, later extended until the end of the season.

On 7 June 2018 Corr signed a new six-month deal with Cambridge United, but the spell was disrupted by injury and he left the club when it expired.

Coaching career
At the end of the 2018-19 season, Corr retired from football and on 9 July 2019 Cambridge United announced, that they had hired Corr as a development coach.

On 6 January 2020, Corr was appointed manager of St Neots Town as part of a new strategic collaboration between both clubs. Corr took over with St Neots 2nd from bottom of the Southern Central league. He left a year later after Covid-19 restrictions stopped the season with St Neots in 3rd place after 11 games and having reached the 2nd round proper of the FA Trophy, the furthest the club had gone in their history. 

Corr was appointed 1st team coach at Cambridge United in May 2021.

Honours
Southend United
Football League Two play-offs: 2014–15

Supporters player of the year 2014/15

Swindon Town
Football League Two promotion 2006/07

Goal of the Season 2007/08

References

External links

1985 births
Living people
Association footballers from County Wicklow
Republic of Ireland association footballers
Association football forwards
Leeds United F.C. players
Sheffield Wednesday F.C. players
Bristol City F.C. players
Swindon Town F.C. players
Exeter City F.C. players
Southend United F.C. players
Cambridge United F.C. players
English Football League players
Cambridge United F.C. non-playing staff